The Dollyrots vs. Bowling for Soup is a  7" split EP released by pop punk bands The Dollyrots and Bowling for Soup, in which the bands cover each other's songs, with The Dollyrots covering Bowling for Soup's "High School Never Ends" and Bowling for Soup covering The Dollyrots' "Because I'm Awesome." It was limited to 1,000 copies that were signed by both bands and sold through Bowling for Soup's online store as well as during Bowling for Soup and The Dollyrots West Coast U.S. tour in August 2011. A digital version was released at a later date with two additional bonus tracks. The digital version was released in November 2011 and included a Bowling for Soup cover of The Dollyrots' "Rollercoaster" and a Dollyrots cover of Bowling for Soup's "Almost."

Track listing

7" Vinyl Edition

Personnel
The Dollyrots
 Kelly Ogden – bass, vocals
 Luis Cabezas – guitar
 Chris Black – drums

Bowling for Soup
 Jaret Reddick – lead vocals, guitar
 Erik Chandler – bass, vocals
 Chris Burney – guitar, vocals
 Gary Wiseman – drums
 Linus of Hollywood – producer
 Dave Pearson – artwork and illustration

Release history

References

The Dollyrots albums
Bowling for Soup albums
2011 EPs
Split EPs